Henry Alexander Livingston (August 26, 1776 – June 9, 1849) was an American politician from New York.

Life
Livingston was born on August 26, 1776.  He was the only child of John Henry Livingston (1746–1825), President of Queen's College, and Sarah (née Livingston) Livingston (1752–1814).

His maternal grandparents were Philip Livingston, a Continental Congressman and signor of the Declaration of Independence, and Christina (née Ten Broeck) Livingston, sister of Albany Mayor Abraham Ten Broeck.  Through his mother, he was a first cousin of Lt. Gov. Edward P. Livingston, and his aunt, Helena Livingston (1767–1859), was married to Justice Jonas Platt (1769–1834).  His paternal grandparents were  Dr. Henry Livingston and Susannah Storm (née Conklin) Livingston.  Through his father, he was the nephew of Continental Congressman Gilbert Livingston, author Henry Livingston Jr. (the grandfather of U.S. Senator Sidney Breese and Admiral Samuel Livingston Breese), and Alida (née Livingston) Woolsey.

Career
Livingston spent his life on the patrimonial estate on the Hudson River near Poughkeepsie, the estate of his grandfather Henry, himself the eldest son of his father, Gilbert, who was the youngest of three sons born to Robert Livingston the Elder, 1st Lord of Livingston Manor and progenitor of the Livingston family in America.

He was a member of the New York State Assembly (Dutchess Co.) in 1827 as a member of the 50th New York State Legislature.

He was a member of the New York State Senate (2nd D.) from 1838 to 1841, sitting in the 61st, 62nd, 63rd and 64th New York State Legislatures.

Personal life
Henry A. Livingston married Elizabeth Beekman (1779–1811), the daughter of James Beekman and Jane (née Lefferts) Beekman. Together, they were the parents of nine children, including:

 Sarah Livingston (1797–1818), who married Rev. Brogan Hoff.
 Eliza H. Livingston (1799–1819)
 John Alexander Livingston (1801–1865), who married Louisa Ridgeley Bradford (1808–1863) in 1832.
 Abraham Henry Livingston, who married Anna T. Greene.
 Louisa Matilda Livingston (1807–1849), who married Edward K. James (1803–1860).
 Russell Livingston, who married Louisa B. Finlay.

After his first wife's death in 1811, Livingston was married to Frederika Charlotte Sayers (1797–1870), the daughter of James and Euphemia Sayers, who was born in Bath, England. Together, Henry and Frederika were the parents of nine more children, including:

 Robert Sayers Livingston (1819–1821)
 Frederica Charlotte Livingston (d. 1898), who married Washington Kendrick (d. 1881)
 Cornelia Beekman Livingston (d. 1858)
 Christina Ten Broeck Livingston (d. 1858)
 Jane Murray Livingston (1830–1911), who married Robert Ralston Crosby (1815–1892), brother of Clarkson F. Crosby.
 Henrietta Ulrica Livingston (d. 1916)
 Henry Philip Livingston (d. 1861)
 Augustus Linlithgow Livingston (1839–1911), who married Elizabeth Matilda Danforth (1843–1916)

Livingston died on June 9, 1849 in Poughkeepsie, Dutchess County, New York. He was buried at the Poughkeepsie Rural Cemetery.

References

Notes

Sources
Death notice in The American Quarterly Register and Magazine publ. by James Stryker (Philadelphia, 1849; Vol. II, No. II, pg. 505)
The Pictorial Field-Book of the Revolution by Benson J. Lossing (New York City, 1855; Vol. 1, pg. 383f)
Livingston family tree

External links

1776 births
1849 deaths
New York (state) state senators
Politicians from Poughkeepsie, New York
New York (state) Whigs
19th-century American politicians
Members of the New York State Assembly
American people of Dutch descent
American people of Scottish descent
Henry A
Schuyler family